Mark Douglas Holton (born April 2, 1958) is an American actor, best known for portraying Francis Buxton in Pee-wee's Big Adventure (1985), Chubby in the Teen Wolf film series and Ozzie Jones in Leprechaun (1993), and Leprechaun Returns (2018).

Early life
Holton was born in Oklahoma City. He graduated from Okmulgee High School in 1976. He attended Northeastern State University in Tahlequah, Oklahoma.

Career
Holton's professional breakthrough came with the role of Francis Buxton, Pee-wee Herman's nemesis in the blockbuster comedy Pee-wee's Big Adventure (1985). He found further fame as high school basketball player Chubby in the werewolf comedies Teen Wolf (1985), and Teen Wolf Too (1987). His mainstream visibility grew with supporting roles in The Naked Gun: From the Files of Police Squad! (1988), A League of Their Own (1992), My Life (1993), and Little Giants (1994).

Holton has been equally prolific in television, performing in episodes of The Young and the Restless, Seinfeld, MacGyver, Sledge Hammer!, Tim and Eric Awesome Show, Great Job!, Star Trek: Deep Space Nine, NCIS, and NYPD Blue. He also makes an appearance in The Ramones' music video for "Something to Believe In". Following his cameo appearance in The Adventures of Rocky and Bullwinkle (2000), Holton refocused his attention on independent film and television projects. His first leading film role came through the direct-to-video drama Gacy (2003), in which he portrayed serial killer John Wayne Gacy.

Holton retired from performing in the late 2000s. He made a comeback with a second portrayal of B.M. Fahrtz in Tim and Eric Awesome Show Great Job! Awesome 10 Year Anniversary Version, Great Job? (2017). He returned to film acting in the made-for-television Leprechaun Returns (2018), a direct sequel to the original cult comedy hit Leprechaun (1993), reprising the role of Ozzie from the film.

Filmography

References

External links

 

1958 births
Living people
Male actors from Oklahoma City
American male film actors
American male television actors
20th-century American male actors
21st-century American male actors